is a Shinto shrine located in Miyazaki, Miyazaki Prefecture, Japan. It is dedicated to Futodama, Empress Jingū and Emperor Ōjin.

Shinto shrines in Miyazaki Prefecture
Hachiman shrines
Religious buildings and structures completed in 1093